Oscar Reid Moseley, Jr. (August 10, 1924 – February 26, 1994) was an AP All American football player. He played college football for the Georgia Bulldogs football team in 1944 1945 and 1946. He led the NCAA in both 1944 and 1945 in total receptions and receiving yardage and in 1945 in yards per reception. Moseley also lettered for Georgia in basketball, track, and tennis. In addition Moseley was a swim and diving champion at Georgia. He later worked as a football coach at various military and high schools, including Riverside Military, St. Augustine High School, South Hambersham High School, Page HS Greensboro NC, and Hargrave Military Academy. His son O. Reid Moseley III “Skip” led Hargrave to a 1972 basketball championship and was quarterback captain of the football team.

See also
 List of college football yearly receiving leaders

References

1924 births
1994 deaths
American football ends
Georgia Bulldogs football players
Players of American football from Georgia (U.S. state)
People from Newnan, Georgia